The 18th Slovenia Division (Slovene: Osemnajsta slovenska divizija, Serbo-Croatian: Osamnaesta slovenačka divizija / Осамнаеста словеначка дивизија) was a Yugoslav Partisan division formed in Zdenska Vas on September 14th, 1943. Upon formation it consisted of around 3,350 soldiers in three brigades, those being: the 8th, 9th and 10th Slovenia Brigades. The division was commanded by Rado Pehaček and its political commissar was Janez Hribar - Tone. On October 3rd, 1943, it became a part of the 7th Corps. The division operated in Slovenia.

References 

Divisions of the Yugoslav Partisans
Military units and formations established in 1943